Floating in My Mother's Palm is a 1990 novel
by Ursula Hegi.

The story centers on a young girl, Hannah Malter, growing up in post-war Germany and her family and many of their fellow townsfolk in 'Burgdorf', including Trudi Montag who also appears in Hegi's Stones from the River.

References 

1990 American novels
Novels set in Germany